The 2020 Zagreb shooting, commonly referred to as the St. Mark's Square attack, occurred on 12 October 2020 in Zagreb, Croatia, when 22-year-old Danijel Bezuk approached Banski dvori, which houses the office of the Prime Minister and serves as the meeting place of the government, on St. Mark's Square and started shooting at it with an assault rifle, wounding a police officer in the process. In the aftermath, the perpetrator ran off to a nearby neighborhood and committed suicide.

Attack 

The attack was committed by 22-year-old Danijel Bezuk from Kutina, Croatia, who did not appear at his workplace in Zagreb, but instead headed to St. Mark's Square where the buildings of the Croatian government (Banski dvori), Croatian Parliament (Sabor) and the Constitutional Court are located. He subsequently took out an automatic rifle (5.45×39mm AK-74) and opened fire on the 33-year-old police officer, Oskar Fiuri, who was guarding the main entrance, wounding him with four rounds, after which he continued shooting on Banski dvori.

Another police officer who was guarding the Parliament on the opposite side of the square noticed what was happening, so he took out his personal weapon and fired at the attacker. Bezuk ran to the nearby street to take cover and reloaded his gun. He then returned and fired on the police again, but was again suppressed by the police fire, and fled the scene in response.

He was helped by the bystanders, who called an ambulance. The wounded policeman was taken to Sisters of Charity Hospital in Zagreb, where he was treated for his wounds. Police then swarmed St. Mark Square looking for the attacker, but soon received the report of shots heard in the nearby Jabukovac Street, which turned out to be Bezuk taking his own life.

Motives 
Soon after the attack, the Croatian media found out the attacker's identity and started analyzing Bezuk's Facebook account, which featured written statuses, expressing his frustrations with the state of affairs in Croatia. The posts included a link to a YouTube video dedicated to snipers, captioned with: "I wish I was one of these guys, to take out Serbs". In another post, he described himself as "a tourist in his own country". In yet another post, he expressed his support for far-right Croatian Party of Rights (HSP)'s early 1990s paramilitary wing Croatian Defence Forces (HOS). In his last Facebook status before committing suicide, he wrote: "Enough of frauds and ruthless trampling of human values without [any] responsibility".

In February 2021, Prime Minister Andrej Plenković stated that the motive of the attack was his party Croatian Democratic Union (HDZ)'s coalition with the Independent Democratic Serb Party (SDSS).

Reactions 
After the Croatian media started writing about Bezuk's Facebook profile, his profile received support from many other users. However, it was later deleted.

In the immediate aftermath of the shooting, President Zoran Milanović held a press conference in which he called the government to protect the central state institutions, saying that "they are not a tourist destination". On the same day, police raided Bezuk's family home, where they apparently found two rifles with optical sights, silencers, and over 1,000 pieces of ammunition. On 14 October, Prime Minister Plenković said that "[Croatia is] having a serious issue with radicalism" and that the attack had elements of a terrorist act, based on the Croatian law on terrorism. He also urged the police, State's Attorney Office of the Republic of Croatia and Security and Intelligence Agency to investigate "how a young man could become so radicalized". He also appealed to society to "raise the level of respect, in order to build a public culture which will prevent similar incidents from happening". On 15 October 2020, Minister of Croatian Veterans Tomo Medved, while commenting the attack, pointed out that there was a "series of clues indicating that the Prime Minister himself was the attacker's target".

Investigation 
On 16 October, Croatian daily newspapers Jutarnji list, referring to the source from the police, published the article saying that prior to the attack Bezuk searched the internet for texts and photographs of government office location, building interior and regular movements of the President and the Prime Minister.

The investigation was concluded on 22 July 2021. The State's Attorney Office rejected the criminal complaint against Bezuk since he was deceased, and reported that the investigation found no evidence that there were any accomplices or instigators to the attack. In September 2022, Jutarnji list wrote that Bezuk's final message before committing suicide was identical to paroles of radical Croatian right-wing group called Banovina Horosan which advocates spread of Islam and installing of sharia law in Croatia.

Closure of St. Mark's Square 
Following the attack, the police fenced off St. Mark's Square, announcing an "emergency security plan" for the square. As of 2022, the square remains closed. Several politicians have called on the Croatian government and the Ministry of Internal Affairs to reopen the square, as it is the centre of Zagreb's historic Upper Town, and its closure inconveniences tourists, workers and the Upper Town residents.

See also 

 2020 in Croatia
 List of terrorist incidents in 2020
 List of lone wolf terrorist attacks

References

2020 in Croatia
2020 shooting
Attacks on buildings and structures in 2020
Attacks on buildings and structures in Europe
Attacks on government buildings and structures
Neo-fascist terrorist incidents
Terrorist incidents in Croatia
Terrorist incidents in Europe in 2020
2020 shooting
October 2020 crimes in Europe
2020
2020 crimes in Croatia